Pundlikrao Ramji Gawali (born 11 November 1949 in Gohgaon, Akola, Maharashtra) is an Indian politician and member of the Shiv Sena. He was Member of Parliament representing Washim from 1996 to 1998 in the 11th Lok Sabha.

References 

People from Washim district
Shiv Sena politicians
India MPs 1996–1997
Lok Sabha members from Maharashtra
Living people
21st-century Indian politicians
Maharashtra politicians
1949 births
People from Akola district